The Sunrise Athletic Conference was a college athletic conference founded in 2002 and affiliated with the National Association of Intercollegiate Athletics (NAIA). Its member institutions were in Maine, Massachusetts, New York, and Vermont.

History

The SAC was founded when both the Maine Athletic Conference and the Mayflower Conference disbanded in the spring of 2002. Both of these conferences were NAIA conferences of long standing. The conference formed with eight inaugural members: the College of St. Joseph, Fisher College, Lyndon State College, the University of Maine at Fort Kent, the University of Maine at Machias, the University of Maine at Presque Isle, Paul Smith's College and Vermont Technical College.

Royal Goheen became the commissioner of the Sunrise Conference and continued to serve as the only commissioner in the history of the SAC until it disbanded. In 1997, Goheen took on the role as the commissioner of the Maine Athletic Conference before its disbandment. In 2010 he was elected to the NAIA Hall of Fame.

In 2004, the Sunrise Conference added the State University of New York at Canton after the university joined the NAIA as part of a transition from two-year to four-year institution. The conference held steady with nine members until Paul Smith's College and Lyndon State College left in 2010, dropping SAC membership to seven.

The conference disbanded in 2011 when the College of St. Joseph, Vermont Technical College and the University of Maine at Machias left the conference and the NAIA for the United States Collegiate Athletic Association (USCAA) and the Yankee Small College Conference (YSCC). The University of Maine at Fort Kent, the University of Maine at Presque Isle, and the State University of New York at Canton then left with no regional NAIA competition to become independents in the USCAA.

In addition, Maine–Presque Isle is transitioning to an independent member of NCAA Division III, while SUNY Canton was accepted into the transition process to move from the NAIA to NCAA D-III. Fisher College joined the American Mideast Conference.

Chronlogical timeline
 2002 - In the spring of 2002, the Sunrise Athletic Conference (a.k.a. the Sunrise) was founded due to dissolutions of the Maine Athletic Conference and the Mayflower Conference. Charter members included the College of St. Joseph, Fisher College, Lyndon State College (now Northern Vermont University at Lyndon), University of Maine at Fort Kent, University of Maine at Machias, University of Maine at Presque Isle, Paul Smith's College and Vermont Technical College, effective beginning the 2002-03 academic year.
 2004 - The State University of New York at Canton (a.k.a. SUNY Canton) joined the Sunrise, effective in the 2004-05 academic year.
 2006 - Lyndon State (now Northern Vermont–Lyndon) left the Sunrise to join the Division III ranks of the National Collegiate Athletic Association (NCAA), effective after the 2005-06 academic year.
 2010 - Paul Smith's left the Sunrise and the NAIA to join the United States Collegiate Athletic Association (USCAA) and the Yankee Small College Conference (YSCC), effective after the 2009-10 academic year.
 2011 - The Sunrise would cease operations as an athletic conference, effective after the 2010-11 academic year; as many schools left to join their respective new home primary conferences, effective beginning the 2011-12 academic year: Fisher to join the American Mideast Conference, while the rest would leave the NAIA and join the USCAA: St. Joseph, Vermont Tech, Maine–Machias to join the YSCC; and Maine–Fort Kent, Maine–Presque Isle and SUNY Canton to join as USCAA Independents (the latter two are either accepted or in the process into transition from the NAIA to NCAA Division III).

Member schools

Final members
The Sunrise had seven full members in the conference's final season, only two were private schools:

Notes

Former members
The Sunrise had two other full members during the conference's tenure, one was a private school:

Notes

Membership timeline

Sports

Conference championships

Women Volleyball
 2010 UMaine Fort Kent
 2009 UMaine Presque Isle
 2008 UMaine Presque Isle
 2007 SUNY Canton
 2006 UMaine Machias
 2005 UMaine Machias

Men Cross Country
 2010 SUNY Canton

Women Cross Country
 2010 UMaine Presque Isle

Men Soccer
 2010 UMaine Fort Kent
 2009 UMaine Fort Kent
 2008 UMaine Fort Kent
 2007 UMaine Fort Kent
 2006 UMaine Fort Kent

Women Soccer
 2010 UMaine Fort Kent
 2009 UMaine Fort Kent
 2008 UMaine Fort Kent
 2007 SUNY Canton
 2006 UMaine Fort Kent

Men Basketball
 2011 Fisher College
 2010 UMaine Fort Kent
 2009 Fisher College
 2008 College of St. Joseph
 2007 Fisher College
 2006 Fisher College

Women Basketball
 2011 UMain Machias
 2010 UMaine Fort Kent
 2009 UMaine Fort Kent
 2008 UMaine Fort Kent
 2007 College of St. Joseph
 2006 UMaine Fort Kent

Men Golf
 2010 UMaine Presque Isle
 2008 UMaine Presque Isle

Baseball
 2011 Fisher College
 2010 Fisher College
 2009 Fisher College
 2008 Fisher College
 2007 Fisher College
 2006 Fisher College

Softball
 2011 SUNY Canton
 2010 SUNY Canton
 2009 UMaine Presque Isle
 2008 College of St. Joseph
 2007 College of St. Joseph

References

External links
 Official website

Northeastern United States
Sports in the Eastern United States
Defunct NAIA conferences